The Cecil Plains Branch was a branch railway line on the Darling Downs in Queensland, Australia. It operated from 1914 to 1994.

History

On 5 December 1911, the Parliament of Queensland approved the construction of a  line to run from the Darling Downs town of Oakey southwest to the Mount Russell region.

Work began in May 1914 and the line to Mount Russell opened on 20 September 1915 terminating at the newly named town of Evanslea.  Intermediate stops were established at Tangkam, Yargullen, Aubigny, Purrawunda, Motley, Boora-Mugga, Mount Tyson and Mondam.

In 1917, work began on a  extension of the line further west to Cecil Plains, with intermediate stops established at Norillee, Bongeen, Norwin, Mywybilla, Nangwee and Horrane. That section of the line opened on 29 April 1919.

A passenger rail motor service plied the line fortnightly during the 1940s, and weekly during the 1950s, until withdrawn.

The line closed in 1994.

A 1.3-kilometre section of the Cecil Plains line was rebuilt in 2016, using more than 1900 sleepers and 2,300 tonnes of ballast. this was undertaken so as to allow Oakey Beef Exports to move cattle by rail (through Watco Australia) from Quilpie, Charleville, Morven, Roma and Mitchell.

References

External links
 1925 map of the Queensland railway system

Closed railway lines in Queensland
Darling Downs
Railway lines opened in 1915
1915 establishments in Australia
Railway lines closed in 1994
1994 disestablishments in Australia